Nay Angiz (also Romanized as Nāy Angīz; also known as Nā’īn Gaz, Naugaz, and Now Gaz) is a village in Gerit Rural District, Papi District, Khorramabad County, Lorestan Province, Iran. At the 2006 census, its population was 312, in 57 families.

References 

Towns and villages in Khorramabad County